Brigadier General Pierre Tremblay OBE, CD MD (c. 1905 – February 2, 1987) was the 19th Canadian Surgeon General. He was awarded the Order of the British Empire in 1946.

References

Surgeons General of Canada
Canadian Officers of the Order of the British Empire
Year of birth missing
Year of death missing
Royal Canadian Army Medical Corps officers
1987 deaths
Université de Montréal alumni
Academic staff of the Université de Montréal
20th-century Canadian physicians
Canadian military personnel of World War II
Canadian generals